

W

References